Rosie Cheng (born 1 August 1998, in Auckland) is a New Zealand tennis player of Chinese descent.

Cheng made her WTA tour debut at the 2015 ASB Classic, having received a wildcard into the doubles tournament with Katherine Westbury. They faced Petra Martić and Anna Tatishvili in the first round, and subsequently lost 0–6, 2–6. Additionally, Cheng made the Auckland Chess team and also was in the Westlake Girls High School orchestra.

References

External links 
 

1998 births
Living people
New Zealand female tennis players
New Zealand people of Chinese descent
People educated at Westlake Girls High School
21st-century New Zealand women